MFM 92.6 is a campus radio station based in Stellenbosch, South Africa. The station broadcasts in the region of a 20 km radius to approximately 35 000 listeners. The station broadcasts 24/7 and is targeted to the youth market, and in particular, Stellenbosch University students. It broadcasts in Afrikaans, English and Xhosa and is a member of the National Association of Broadcasters of South Africa (NAB).

History
The station was started in 1995, broadcasting only in the Stellenbosch University's Student Centre, the Neelsie.

Coverage areas and frequencies 
Stellenbosch and surrounding Boland area
92.6 FM

Broadcast languages
English
Afrikaans
Xhosa

Broadcast time
24/7

Target audience
Youth market (Age Group: 16 - 35)

Programme format
60% Music
40% Talk

Listenership figures

References

External links
 MFM Website
 Student Radio Network
 SAARF Website

Radio stations established in 1995
Companies based in Stellenbosch
Student radio stations in South Africa
Stellenbosch University
1995 establishments in South Africa
Mass media in Stellenbosch